Christchurch is a constituency in Dorset represented in the House of Commons of the UK Parliament since 1997 by Sir Christopher Chope of the Conservative Party.

History 
The original Christchurch constituency, a parliamentary borough, existed from 1572 until 1918.

The constituency was re-created as a county constituency in 1983 from parts of the seats of Christchurch and Lymington, North Dorset and New Forest. It has since 1983 seen strong Conservative majorities, with the exception of a 1993 by-election caused by the death of Robert Adley when it was won by Diana Maddock, a Liberal Democrat. The Conservatives regained the seat at the next general election in 1997, despite their landslide defeat nationally and Chris Chope has retained it ever since. As of 2017, it is the second strongest Conservative seat in terms of voteshare (69.7%) and strongest in terms of majority (49.6%) in the country, although 2017 also saw Labour come second in the seat for the first time in history, having historically been far weaker than the Liberal Democrats and, in 2015, UKIP.

Boundaries 

1983–1997: The Borough of Christchurch, and the District of Wimborne wards of Ameysford, Ferndown Central, Golf Links, Longham, St Leonards and St Ives East, St Leonards and St Ives South, St Leonards and St Ives West, Stapehill, Tricketts Cross, Verwood, West Moors North, West Moors South, and West Parley.

1997–2010: The Borough of Christchurch, and the District of East Dorset wards of Ameysford, Ferndown Central, Golf Links, St Leonards and St Ives East, St Leonards and St Ives South, St Leonards and St Ives West, Tricketts Cross, Verwood, West Moors North, West Moors South, and West Parley.

2010–present: The Borough of Christchurch, and the District of East Dorset wards of Ameysford, Ferndown Central, Ferndown Links, Longham, Parley, St Leonards and St Ives East, St Leonards and St Ives West, Stapehill, and West Moors.

Constituency profile 
The area is not as rural as the adjoining New Forest constituencies, nor as urban as Bournemouth and Poole, and contains a mixed assortment of coastal retirement havens, outlying Bournemouth suburbs and the town of Christchurch itself which has expanded to include dedicated villages of sheltered housing on its outskirts.

Consequently, the present Christchurch seat contains one of the most elderly electorates in the country – only Eastbourne and East Devon have an older average voter age and Christchurch has the highest proportion of over-60s of all UK seats. Having recovered from an early-1990s by-election loss, it is today a very safe Conservative seat, with MP Christopher Chope attaining 65% of the votes, a majority of 47%, at the last general election. It is the safest Tory seat in the South West and on most analyses is on the fringe of the area that usually qualifies as the South West, served by a station with direct links to the capital and closest to London.

Bournemouth Airport is located in the constituency.

Members of Parliament

Parliamentary borough (1572–1918)

MPs 1571–1640

MPs 1640–1832

MPs 1832–1918

County constituency

MPs since 1983

Elections 1983–2019

Elections in the 2010s

Elections in the 2000s

Elections in the 1990s 

Percentage share changes compared with 1992 general election. .

Elections in the 1980s

Election results 1868–1918

Elections in the 1860s

Elections in the 1870s

Elections in the 1880s

Elections in the 1890s

Elections in the 1900s 

The original tally for the 1906 election had Balfour with 3,411 votes and Brassey with 3,408 votes. However, a recount resulted in the increased majority for Balfour.

Elections in the 1910s 

General Election 1914–15:

Another General Election was required to take place before the end of 1915. The political parties had been making preparations for an election to take place and by July 1914, the following candidates had been selected;
Unionist: Henry Croft
Liberal:

Election results 1832–1868

Elections in the 1830s

Elections in the 1840s

Rose resigned by accepting the office of Steward of the Manor of Northstead, causing a by-election.

Elections in the 1850s

Elections in the 1860s

Elections before 1832

Neighbouring constituencies

See also 
 List of parliamentary constituencies in Dorset

Notes

References

Sources

 The BBC/ITN Guide to the New Parliamentary Constituencies (Chichester: Parliamentary Research Services, 1983)
 Boundaries of Parliamentary Constituencies 1885–1972, compiled and edited by F.W.S. Craig (Parliamentary Reference Publications 1972)
 British Parliamentary Election Results 1832–1885, compiled and edited by F.W.S. Craig (Macmillan Press 1977)
 British Parliamentary Election Results 1885–1918, compiled and edited by F.W.S. Craig (Macmillan Press 1974)
 Who's Who of British Members of Parliament: Volume I 1832–1885, edited by M. Stenton (The Harvester Press 1976)
 Who's Who of British Members of Parliament, Volume II 1886–1918, edited by M. Stenton and S. Lees (Harvester Press 1978)
 Who's Who of British Members of Parliament, Volume III 1919–1945, edited by M. Stenton and S. Lees (Harvester Press 1979)
Robert Beatson, A Chronological Register of Both Houses of Parliament (London: Longman, Hurst, Res & Orme, 1807) 
D Brunton & D H Pennington, Members of the Long Parliament (London: George Allen & Unwin, 1954)
Cobbett's Parliamentary history of England, from the Norman Conquest in 1066 to the year 1803 (London: Thomas Hansard, 1808) 
 Maija Jansson (ed.), Proceedings in Parliament, 1614 (House of Commons) (Philadelphia: American Philosophical Society, 1988) * J E Neale, The Elizabethan House of Commons (London: Jonathan Cape, 1949)
 J Holladay Philbin, Parliamentary Representation 1832 – England and Wales (New Haven: Yale University Press, 1965)
 
 Frederic A Youngs, jr, Guide to the Local Administrative Units of England, Vol I (London: Royal Historical Society, 1979)

External links 
nomis Constituency Profile for Christchurch — presenting data from the ONS annual population survey and other official statistics.

Parliamentary constituencies in Dorset
Parliamentary constituencies in Hampshire (historic) 
Politics of Christchurch, Dorset
Constituencies of the Parliament of the United Kingdom established in 1571
Constituencies of the Parliament of the United Kingdom disestablished in 1918
Constituencies of the Parliament of the United Kingdom established in 1983